Spondylus gaederopus is a species of  marine bivalve mollusc, a thorny oyster in the family Spondylidae. This species is endemic to the Mediterranean Sea.
S. gaederopus has low fecundity as they lay up to 404 858 ± 248 014 female eggs per season starting at the age of 3. Additionally, they live to be up to 18 years old.

Description
Spondylus gaederopus attaches itself to the substrate with its lower valve, which is usually white, while the upper valve is usually purple. Specimens that are all white, or all purple do, however, exist.

Uses
The mollusc is edible, and is consumed in Sardinia.

External links
 Sea Life Base Pictures of the live animal, and of the cleaned shell
Pernet, F., Malet, N., Pastoureaud, A., Vaquer, A., Quéré, C., & Dubroca, L. (2012). Marine diatoms sustain growth of bivalves in a mediterranean lagoon. Journal of Sea Research, 68, 20–32. https://doi.org/10.1016/j.seares.2011.11.004 

Spondylidae
Molluscs described in 1758
Taxa named by Carl Linnaeus